The 1890 Nashville Garnet and Blue football team represented the University of Nashville during the 1890 college football season. The team played only one game, in Nashville, Tennessee, sending a challenge to Vanderbilt University. Vanderbilt played its first game, and won 40–0.

Schedule

See also
 List of the first college football games in each US state

References

Nashville
Nashville Garnet and Blue football seasons
Nashville Garnet and Blue football